Micaville is an unincorporated community in Yancey County, North Carolina, United States.  The name comes from a mineral mined there called mica.  It was the central mining location in the county.

Micaville was a main point on the Yancey Railroad (YAN) carrying mica and feldspar, along with fertilizer, building materials, livestock feed and steel spring wire.  Due to  damage from Hurricane Agnes  and flooding from other storms most of the bridges , track and branches  were destroyed.  Engine number 40 now sits abandoned along 19E in Micaville, across the road from the Silver Bullet convenience store.

In the early 1900s, the Black Mountain Railroad, later operating as the Yancey Railroad (YAN) transformed the economy from an agricultural-based  into a mining community with later lumber harvesting adding into the economy.

Education
Micaville Elementary School is operated by Yancey County Schools System.

See also
Burnsville, North Carolina, the neighboring incorporated town and county seat.

References

External links
 Micaville Elementary School
 Yancey County Historical Society
 Black Mountain Railroad and Yancey Railroad history and Micaville photos in background of the train shots.

Unincorporated communities in Yancey County, North Carolina
Unincorporated communities in North Carolina